The Yuan River, also known by its Chinese name as the Yuanjiang, is one of the four largest rivers in Hunan province in southeast-central China. It is a tributary of Yangtze River. The upper stream is called the Longtou River, and downstream it is called the Qingshui or Ch‘ing-shui River. It becomes the Yuan River after its confluence with its northern tributary, the Wu River.

After its merger with the Wu River, the Yuan flows in a northeasterly direction, hugging the western side of the Xuefeng Mountains of Hunan. Ultimately, the Yuan flows into the Dongting Lake at Changde and from there into the Yangtze River. The Yuan serves as a major waterway for western Hunan and eastern Guizhou. The Yuan is navigable for large vessels up to Changde, whereas smaller boats can make it to Taoyuan.

Gallery

See also
 Other Yuan Jiangs and Yuanjiangs

References

External links

Rivers of Hunan
Tributaries of the Yangtze River